The 1998–99 Slovenian Third League was the seventh season of the Slovenian Third League, the third highest level in the Slovenian football system.

League standings

Centre

East

North

West

See also
1998–99 Slovenian Second League

References

External links
Football Association of Slovenia 

Slovenian Third League seasons
3
Slovenia